Black Cap is a prominent black rock peak which surmounts the northwest end of Teall Island, just south of the mouth of Skelton Glacier in Antarctica. It was sighted and given this descriptive name in February 1957 by the New Zealand party of the Commonwealth Trans-Antarctic Expedition (1956-58).

References

Geography of the Ross Dependency